Dadar Vidhan Sabha seat was one of the constituencies of Maharashtra Vidhan Sabha, in India. It was a segment of Mumbai South Central Lok Sabha constituency. Dadar seat existed until the 2004 elections after which it was merged into Mahim seat in 2008.

Members of Vidhan Sabha

Election Results

1962 Vidhan Sabha Elections
 Pralhad Keshav Atre (Independent) : 22,469 votes 
 Trimbak Ramchandra Narawane (INC) : 21843

1985 Vidhan Sabha Elections
 Sharayu G. Thakoor (INC) : 18,134 votes 
 Sudhir Joshi (IND / Shiv Sena) : 14,872

1995 Vidhan Sabha Elections
 Manohar Gajanan Joshi (SHS) : 58,901 votes 
 Sharayu Govind Thakur (INC) : 20,482

See also
 List of constituencies of Maharashtra Legislative Assembly

References

Mumbai City district
Former assembly constituencies of Maharashtra